"Hit Bout It" is a song by American rapper Lil Yachty featuring fellow American rapper Kodak Black. It was released on February 19, 2021 with an accompanying music video. Written alongside producer Carlo Anthony, the song is about the rappers' "rockstar lifestyles".

Music video
Prior to releasing it, Lil Yachty shared a behind-the-scenes of the music video. The video begins with him meeting Kodak Black's mother and family, and enjoying Haitian cuisine with them. The rappers cruise in Ferraris, display their jewelry, and hit the strip club. They also meet with rappers Gucci Mane and Trick Daddy.

Charts

References

2021 singles
2021 songs
Lil Yachty songs
Kodak Black songs
Songs written by Lil Yachty
Songs written by Kodak Black
Motown singles